The Four III is a Chinese-Hong Kong 3D wuxia film directed by Gordon Chan and Janet Chun. It is the final installment of the trilogy based on Woon Swee Oan's novel series, after The Four (2012) and The Four II (2013).

Cast
 Deng Chao as Leng Linqi/Lengxue (Cold Blood) 
 Liu Yifei as Sheng Yayu/Wuqing (Emotionless) 
 Collin Chou as Tie Youxia/Tieshou (Iron Hands) 
 Ronald Cheng as Cui Lueshang/Zhuiming (Life Snatcher) 
 Anthony Wong as Zhuge Zhengwo
 Jiang Yiyan as Ji Yaohua
 Liu Yan as Ru Yan (Lady Fog) 
 Wu Xiubo as An Shigeng (God of Wealth) 
 Sheren Tang as Jiaoniang (Aunt Poise) 
 Waise Lee as Prince 
 Alec Su
 Yu Chenghui as Lord An
 Bao Bei'er as Dalang (Big Wolf) 
 Xiang Tianran as Ling'er (Bell) 
 Gui Gui as Ding Dang
 Lawrence Lau

References

External links
 

2014 films
Chinese sequel films
Wuxia films
Films directed by Gordon Chan
Chinese 3D films
Hong Kong 3D films
2014 3D films
Films based on Chinese novels
Films set in 12th-century Song dynasty
Hong Kong sequel films
Adaptations of works by Woon Swee Oan
Chinese martial arts films
2014 martial arts films
2010s Hong Kong films